James Harte (born 27 February 1958) is a former Irish Labour Party politician and was a member of Seanad Éireann from April 2011 to September 2015.

Formerly an elected representative of Fine Gael, he left after failing to win the party's nomination for the 2007 general election, and ran unsuccessfully as an independent instead. He joined the Labour Party in 2010, running unsuccessfully for that party at the 2011 general election but was subsequently elected to the Seanad.

Background
Harte was educated at St Eunan's College in Letterkenny, and obtained a B.A. in Psychology from University College Dublin. He set up his own insurance broker business, Harte Insurances, at the age of 24.

The son of former Fine Gael TD Paddy Harte, he was elected as a Fine Gael candidate to Letterkenny Town Council in 1994 and subsequently to Donegal County Council in 1999. In 2006 he resigned from Fine Gael after failing to secure a nomination from the party to contest the Donegal North-East constituency for the 2007 general election. He subsequently stood as an independent candidate at that election but was not elected.

National politics
Harte joined the Labour Party in 2010 and was that party's candidate for the 2011 general election for Donegal North-East, where he was unsuccessful in winning a seat. Harte was subsequently elected to Seanad Éireann on the Industrial and Commercial Panel in April 2011. He became the Labour Party Seanad spokesperson on Enterprise, Jobs and Innovation.

In February 2012, he offered to pay for the flight of a Polish worker living in Donegal to return "home" to stop her receiving unemployment benefit and FAS training. It later transpired the article was mistranslated from Polish. After it became apparent the article Harte was talking about was mistranslated many people took to Twitter to question him about his opinion. In response Harte began to insult various users. He also accused some users of being xenophobic against Donegal while at the same time accusing other users of being "D4 types" in a derogatory manner. He later removed his comments, though accepted full responsibility for them.

Health
In the early hours of 16 November 2013, Harte was found unconscious at Newmarket Square, Dublin with severe head injuries, having suffered a fall. He was taken to Beaumont Hospital and put in an induced coma, and underwent surgery for a fractured skull and brain trauma. He had attended the Ireland–Latvia soccer friendly at the Aviva Stadium some hours earlier. In late November 2013, he moved his hand. In January 2014, Harte was transferred back to Beaumont Hospital in a critical condition.

Harte resigned from the Seanad on 23 September 2015, and underwent rehabilitative care for 2 years. As of May 2020, he is in Larissa Lodge Nursing Home.

References

External links

1958 births
Living people
Alumni of University College Dublin
People with disorders of consciousness
Fine Gael politicians
Independent politicians in Ireland
Labour Party (Ireland) senators
Local councillors in County Donegal
Members of the 24th Seanad
People educated at St Eunan's College
People from Lifford
People with traumatic brain injuries
Politicians from County Donegal